Jennifer Patrick-Swift is an American softball coach who was the head coach at North Carolina State. till March 2,2023

Coaching career

St. Francis

NC State
On June 2, 2018, Jennifer Patrick-Swift was announced as the new head coach of the NC State softball program.

Head coaching record

College

References

Living people
Female sports coaches
American softball coaches
Year of birth missing (living people)
Methodist Monarchs softball players
Washington & Jefferson Presidents softball coaches
Chowan Hawks softball coaches
York Spartans softball coaches
Millersville Marauders softball coaches
Seton Hill Griffins softball coaches
Saint Francis Red Flash softball coaches
NC State Wolfpack softball coaches